The Förster Cliffs are a set of cliffs located east-northeast of Stark Point, running east–west for  and rising to  in northern James Ross Island. They were named by the UK Antarctic Place-Names Committee in 1987 after Reinhard Förster (1935–87), a West German geologist from the University of Munich, who was a member of the British Antarctic Survey field party to the area, 1985–86.

References 

Cliffs of James Ross Island